Santa Maria di Licodia (Sicilian: Santa Marìa di Licuddìa ) is a town and comune in the Metropolitan City of Catania, eastern Sicily, southern Italy.

History
Santa Maria di Licodia occupies traditionally the site of the ancient Aetna, a settlement founded by the colonists whom Hiero I of Syracuse had placed at Catania after their expulsion by the original inhabitants in 461 BC, which absorbed or incorporated an already existing Sicel town named Inessa.

Main sights

Chiesa Madre (Mother Church). Of the original medieval building, a bell tower has remained
Cherubim Fountain (1757)
Casina del Cavaliere, a Benedictine convent of medieval origin, outside the town.

A large hoard of coins was found also outside Santa Maria di Licodia in 1891.

The ground is covered with fragments of tiles and pottery of the classical period, and it is probably a hastily built encampment of historic times rather than a primitive fortification, as there are no prehistoric traces.

Twin towns
 Rabat, Malta
 Pisano Eteno, a frazione of Zafferana Etnea, Italy
 San Giuseppe di Ognina, Catania, Italy

References

Municipalities of the Metropolitan City of Catania